Zar'it is an moshav in northern Israel. Located in the Upper Galilee near the Lebanese border, it falls under the jurisdiction of Ma'ale Yosef Regional Council.

History
Zar'it is located on the land of the depopulated Palestinian villages of Al-Nabi Rubin, Suruh and Tarbikha.

The moshav was established in 1967 by young people with a moshav background from the Galilee as part of Operation Sof Sof, designed to strengthen Jewish presence in the Galilee. It was initially named Kfar Rosenwald (Rosenwald Village) after American philanthropist William Rosenwald. However, the foreign-sounding name of the village didn't sit well with its residents, so as a compromise, Yehuda Ziv, the head of community naming suggested an acronym incorporating Rosenwald's name within a Hebrew word, Zar'it (Zekher Rosenwald Imanu Yisha'er Tamid, lit. Rosenwald's memory will be with us always).

The village was the site of Hezbollah's initial attack in the 2006 Lebanon War, and was the target of several rocket attacks.

References

Moshavim
Populated places established in 1967
Populated places in Northern District (Israel)
1967 establishments in Israel